Lee Massey McLaughlin (February 28, 1917 – August 13, 1968) was an American football player with the Green Bay Packers of the National Football League (NFL) and a head football coach at Washington and Lee University.

Biography
McLaughlin was born on February 28, 1917, in Brownsburg, Virginia. During World War II, he served as an officer in the United States Navy Lee also went on to start Camp Maxwelton and Camp Lachlan with his wife Rosa in Lexington, Va. He died on August 13, 1968.

Playing career
McLaughlin  was the captain of the track team and played football at the collegiate level for the University of Virginia.  He was subsequently drafted and played Guard for the Green Bay Packers, starting all eight games of the 1941 NFL season, before leaving football to fight in World War II.

Coaching career
After the war, McLaughlin began coaching for Episcopal High School in Alexandria, Virginia.  After successful seasons coaching at the high school level, McLaughlin was named head football coach at Washington and Lee University in 1957.  There he the team to the National Small College Championship in 1961 and was named National College Coach of the Year that season. In 1966, he was awarded the Sports Illustrated Silver Anniversary Award.

He was inducted into the Virginia Sports Hall of Fame in 1987.

Head coaching record

College

See also
 List of Green Bay Packers players

References

1917 births
1968 deaths
American football guards
Green Bay Packers players
Virginia Cavaliers football players
Virginia Cavaliers men's track and field athletes
Washington and Lee Generals football coaches
High school football coaches in Virginia
United States Navy personnel of World War II
United States Navy officers
People from Rockbridge County, Virginia
Players of American football from Virginia